Sir George Pollock, 1st Baronet (1786–1872) was a British Indian Army officer.

George Pollock may also refer to:

 George Pollock (Australian politician) (1890–1939), member of the Queensland Legislative Assembly
 George Pollock (director) (1907–1979), British film director
 George David Pollock (1817–1897), British surgeon
 George Pollock (1886–1950), engineer and president of Pollock-Stockton Shipbuilding Company and Pollock Construction Company in Stockton, California
 George Pollock (barrister) (1901–1991), British barrister, journalist, military officer, and director of the British Employers' Confederation